Winning may refer to:

 Victory

Film
 Winning (film), a 1969 movie starring Paul Newman
 Winning: The Racing Life of Paul Newman, a 2015 documentary by Adam Carolla and Nate Adams

Music
 Winning, an album by Ten Foot Pole, 2022

Songs
 "Winning" (song), by Russ Ballard, 1976; covered by Santana, 1981
 "Winnin, by Chief Keef from Back from the Dead, 2012
 "Winning", by Chris Rea from Wired to the Moon, 1984
 "Winnin", by City Girls from City on Lock, 2020
 "Winning", by Emily Haines and the Soft Skeleton from Knives Don't Have Your Back, 2006
 "Winning", by Gentle Giant from The Missing Piece
 "Winning (A song by Charlie Sheen)", by the Gregory Brothers

Other uses
 Winning (book), a 2005 management book by Jack Welch
 Winning Appliances, an Australian retailer

People with surname
 Charles Winning (1889–1967), Australian cricketer 
 David Winning (born 1961), Canadian and American film director, producer, screenwriter
 Thomas Winning (1925–2001), Scottish Roman Catholic cardinal

See also
 Charlie Sheen, who used the word as a catchphrase
 
 
 Win (disambiguation)
 Winner (disambiguation)